Rent-A-Girlfriend is an anime series adapted from the manga series of the same title written by Reiji Miyajima. The second season featured returning staff and casts, with Studio Comet cooperating in the production. The season aired from July 2 to September 17, 2022.


Episode list

Notes

References

External links
  
 

2022 Japanese television seasons